Argyrochosma jonesii, known as Jones' false cloak fern, is a species of fern native to the southwestern United States and Sonora, Mexico. It grows on calcareous rocks, and has small, finely-divided leaves with a leathery texture and dark axes connecting the leaf segments. Unlike many members of Argyrochosma, it does not secrete white powder on the underside of its leaves. First described as a species in 1917, it was transferred to the new genus Argyrochosma (the "false cloak ferns") in 1987, recognizing their distinctness from the "cloak ferns" (Notholaena sensu stricto).

Description
The rhizome is short and horizontal, with leaves closely spaced. It bears linear or linear-subulate, uniformly colored, brown or reddish-brown scales, sometimes nearly black in color, with entire (toothless) margins and a thin texture.

The leaf blade is ovate to lanceolate, and ranges from bipinnate (cut into pinnae and pinnules) to tripinnate (with pinnules cut into pinnulets) at the base, where it is most divided. It is not reduced in width at the base. The base is obtuse (blunt), while the tip is acute (pointed). The rachis (leaf axis) is rounded or slightly flattened on the upper side, sometimes even shallowly grooved, and dark in color, as are the axes of the leaf segments. The color continues into the base of the leaf segments, without a distinct joint. The axes are straight, rather than zig-zagging. Each blade has 4 to 6 pairs of pinnae, ovate or deltoid-ovate in shape. These are in turn divided into 2 to 3 pairs of orbicular (circular) or deltoid to ovate pinnules, obtuse at the tip and cordate (heart-shaped) or truncate (abruptly terminating) at the base and borne on a short stalk. The ones closest to the blade base may be subdivided into another set of segments, while the pinnules closer to the blade tip are lobed or entire. The leaf tissue is dark blue-green and of a leathery to fleshy texture, obscuring the veins from the upper surface, and does not bear hairs or scales on either surface. Unlike many species in the genus, farina (powder) is not present on either surface of the leaf. The leaves do not curl when dry.

In fertile leaf segments, the sporangia are close to the margin, borne along the further half of the secondary veins branching from the midrib of the segment. Each sporangium contains 64 spores. The leaf segments, at most, are slightly curled under, not concealing the sporangia, and their tissue is not modified into a false indusium.

A. jonesii is a sexual diploid, with a chromosome count of 2n = 54. A tetraploid cytotype was thought to exist, but this is believed to be the result of plants occasionally producing 32 diploid (rather than 64 haploid) spores and giving rise to diploid gametophytes.

It is most similar in appearance to the closely-related A. lumholtzii, and both are present in Sonora, but the latter has a darker leaf stalk and axes and the leaf is less highly divided.

Taxonomy
The species was first described in 1917 as Notholaena jonesii by William Ralph Maxon. It was named for Marcus E. Jones, who collected the material on which the description was based.

Both Edwin Copeland and Charles Alfred Weatherby suggested in the 1940s that a group of ferns related to Notholaena nivea might represent a distinct genus of its own. Weatherby thought that, until that genus was described, the group might better be placed in Pellaea, rather than in Notholaena, but died in 1949 before he could circumscribe and publish it. Accordingly, in 1950, Conrad Vernon Morton transferred the species to Pellaea as P. jonesii, to provide a name for it in Thomas Henry Kearney's Flowering Plants and ferns of Arizona. In 1958, Philip A. Munz, preparing a flora of California and following Copeland's opinion that Notholaena was best lumped into a broadly defined Cheilanthes, transferred it to that genus as C. jonesii. John T. Mickel, carrying out a similar program of lumping in 1979, accidentally duplicated Munz's combination.

The recognition of the N. nivea group as a genus was finally addressed in 1987 by Michael D. Windham, who was carrying out phylogenetic studies of the cheilanthoids. He elevated Notholaena sect. Argyrochosma to become the genus Argyrochosma, and transferred this species to that genus as A. jonesii. In 2018, Maarten J. M. Christenhusz transferred the species to Hemionitis as H. jonesii, as part of a program to consolidate the cheilanthoid ferns into that genus.

Phylogenetic studies have shown that A. jonesii is a sister species to A. lumholtzii, a rare Sonoran species; these two species form a clade sister to another clade containing A. formosa and A. microphylla. All four species lack farina, and their common ancestor is hypothesized to have diverged from the ancestor of the rest of the genus before farina production developed in the latter.

Distribution and habitat
Argyrochosma jonesii is known in the United States from California, Arizona, Nevada, and southern Utah and in Mexico from Sonora, particularly within the Mojave and Sonoran Deserts.

Conservation
Under the NatureServe conservation status system, A. jonesii is ranked as apparently secure (G4), but it is considered critically imperiled in Utah.

Cultivation
It prefers high light, and moist-dry to dry, well-drained soil, perhaps of high pH.

Notes and references

References

Works cited

External links
Isotype of the species at JSTOR Plant Science.
Jepson Manual eFlora (TJM2) treatment of Argyrochosma jonesii 
UC Photos gallery — Argyrochosma jonesii 

jonesii
Ferns of California
Ferns of Mexico
Ferns of the United States
Flora of Sonora
Flora of the Southwestern United States
Flora of the California desert regions
Flora of the Great Basin
Flora of the Sierra Nevada (United States)
Natural history of the Mojave Desert
Flora of the Sonoran Deserts
Plants described in 1917